Heglach is a river of Baden-Württemberg, Germany. It is a branch of the river Pfinz near Karlsruhe.

See also
List of rivers of Baden-Württemberg

Rivers of Baden-Württemberg
Rivers of Germany